Craig Cole (born August 11, 1975) is a former American football player and current actor and stuntman. Craig attended Abilene Christian where he played football. He also played professionally for the Grand Rapids Rampage of the Arena Football League as well as sixth other organizations from 1999 to 2005. He is the cousin of NFL Hall of Famer Marcus Allen.He has appeared in numerous shows including Walker Texas Ranger, Prison Break, Chase, and The Walking Dead

References

External links 
 Craig Cole IMDb

Living people
Abilene Christian Wildcats football players
Grand Rapids Rampage players
1975 births